Piet van der Kuil (born 10 February 1933 in Velsen) is a former Dutch footballer and the owner of a football school in Velsen. He was part of the Dutch squad at the 1952 Summer Olympics.

Honours
Ajax
Eredivisie: 1956–57
PSV
Eredivisie: 1962–63

References

External links

International career

1933 births
Dutch footballers
Netherlands international footballers
Footballers at the 1952 Summer Olympics
Olympic footballers of the Netherlands
Eredivisie players
AFC Ajax players
PSV Eindhoven players
Association football forwards
People from Velsen
SC Telstar players
Living people
Blauw-Wit Amsterdam players
Footballers from North Holland